Friendship Dam may refer to:

 Afghanistan–India Friendship Dam
 Iran–Turkmenistan Friendship Dam
 Syria–Turkey Friendship Dam